Kundmann is a surname. Notable people with the surname include:

Carl Kundmann (1838–1919), Austrian sculptor
Johanna Kundmann (1914–2000), Austrian lawyer and judge